Martin Greenberg (1918–2013) was an American book publisher, founder of Gnome Press

Martin Greenberg may also refer to:

 Martin Greenberg (poet) (1918–2021), American poet and translator of Goethe
 Martin H. Greenberg (1941–2011), American speculative fiction anthologist and writer
 Martin L. Greenberg (born 1932), American politician and jurist